Holloway Ward is one of sixteen electoral divisions of the London Borough of Islington, is one of the eight making up the Islington South and Finsbury Parliamentary constituency, fifty five making up the North East London Assembly constituency, and is located in the lower Holloway area of Islington in North London in the United Kingdom. The population of the ward at the 2011 Census was 14,983.

The ward is represented on the Borough's council by three councillors, with elections held every four years. At the 2018 local election, all three seats returned Labour Party candidates. Rakhia Ismail, Paul Smith and Diarmaid Ward were elected by wide margins. In November 2020, Ismail, a former mayor of the borough, defected to the Conservative Party.

References

List of wards in Greater London

External links
 Paul Smith

Wards of the London Borough of Islington